FPP may refer to:

Politics 
 Federacja Polskiej Przedsiębiorczości, a defunct political party in Poland
 First-past-the-post voting
 First Peoples Party, a defunct political party in Canada
 Patriotic Front for Progress, a political party in the Central African Republic
 Popular Front of Potosí, a defunct political party in Bolivia
 Fundación para el Progreso, a Chilean libertarian think tank.

Science and medicine 
 Fantasy prone personality
 Farnesyl pyrophosphate
 Final Parsec Problem
 FPP scale, for rating tornado intensity
 Fundamental Physics Prize
 Floating-point processor

Other uses 
 Fiber Patch Placement (FPP)
 Fire Protection Publications, an American publisher
 First-person perspective
 Fish protein powder
 Fixed-point property
 Fixed-priority pre-emptive scheduling
 Floating power plant
 Forest Peoples Programme, a British indigenous-rights organization
 Fund Processing Passport
 Portuguese Roller Sports Federation